Kylie Kofoed (born 1991), from Eagle, Idaho, was Miss Idaho 2010.

Kofoed was the Miss Nampa contestant in the Miss Idaho contest.  Kofoed was at the time of her winning the Miss Idaho title a sophomore at Brigham Young University (BYU) in Provo, Utah.  A member of the Church of Jesus Christ of Latter-day Saints one of Kylie's listed accomplishments was having received her Young Women Recognition Award.

Kofoed is the oldest of ten children, and has performed musically with her entire family.  She is studying music at BYU where she has been a member of the BYU women's chorus.

At Miss America 2011, Kofoed was the only contestant to wear a one-piece swimsuit, drawing media attention and praise from Evangelical Christian bloggers.

References

Sources
Katelyn Beaty, "Miss America and the Bikini Question", Christianity Today

External links
 
 Mormon Times Dec. 4, 2010.
 Miss Idaho page on Kofoed
 Idaho Press June 14, 2010 article

1991 births
Brigham Young University alumni
Latter Day Saints from Idaho
Living people
People from Eagle, Idaho
Miss America 2011 delegates